The 1959 Virginia Cavaliers football team represented the University of Virginia during the 1959 NCAA University Division football season. The Cavaliers were led by second-year head coach Dick Voris and played their home games at Scott Stadium in Charlottesville, Virginia. They competed as members of the Atlantic Coast Conference, finishing in last. Virginia finished without a win and extended their losing streak to 18 games.

Schedule

References

Virginia
Virginia Cavaliers football seasons
College football winless seasons
Virginia Cavaliers football